Van Ness House may refer to:

Van Ness House (Fairfield, New Jersey), listed on the National Register of Historic Places (NRHP)
William W. Van Ness House, Claverak, New York, NRHP-listed

See also
Van Ness Mausoleum, Washington, D.C., NRHP-listed